Klokerblok River is a waterway in the U.S. state of Alaska, near Nome. This river rises a few miles from the coast, north of Cape Topkok. It flows in an easterly direction, and joins Fish River in its delta mouth. Front the upper end of Golofnin Sound, a broad depression extends inland, which includes the lower parts of the valleys of Fish, Klokerblok, and Niukluk Rivers. Except for a  gravel terrace on the western side of Golofnin, there are few, if any, terraces or benches in this area.

References

Rivers of the Seward Peninsula
Rivers of Alaska
Rivers of Nome Census Area, Alaska
Rivers of Unorganized Borough, Alaska